Roxanne "Roxy" Andersen (née Atkins, 26 June 1912 – 6 September 2002) was a Canadian track and field athlete. She won a gold medal at the 1934 USA Indoor Track and Field Championships and a silver medal at the 1936 US Indoor Championships. Apart from competing in athletics, Andersen was the Pacific chair of the Amateur Athletic Union from 1950 to 1976. In 1991, Andersen was inducted into the National Track and Field Hall of Fame.

Personal life
On 26 June 1912, Andersen was born in Montreal, Quebec.

Andersen died in San Francisco, California on 6 September 2002. Andersen was married with no children.

Career
Andersen began her athletic career with the Canadian Ladies Athletic Club. She broke the Canadian record in the 80 metres hurdles event in 1932 and won gold in the Canadian hurdles championship in 1935. Additional records that Andersen held were in the 50 metres hurdles and 90 yards hurdles events. Competing in the United States, Andersen won gold at the 1934 USA Indoor Track and Field Championships and silver at the 1936 USA Indoor Championships. In international competitions, she participated in the 1934 British Empire Games, 1934 Women's World Games,  and the 1936 Summer Olympics.

After World War II, Andersen went to California with her husband and became an American citizen. She served as the Pacific district chair of the Amateur Athletic Union from 1950 to 1976. With the United States national track and field team, she worked with the team at the 1956 Summer Olympics, 1971 Pan American Games and 1983 Pan American Games.

Awards and honors
Andersen was inducted into the National Track and Field Hall of Fame in 1991.

References

External links

1912 births
2002 deaths
Athletes (track and field) at the 1936 Summer Olympics
Canadian female hurdlers
Olympic track and field athletes of Canada
Athletes (track and field) at the 1934 British Empire Games
Commonwealth Games competitors for Canada
Anglophone Quebec people
Athletes from Montreal
Canadian emigrants to the United States